Teagan is a surname and Welsh female or male given name that means 'attractive', 'beautiful' or 'perfect'.

People with the surname or given name include:

 Linda Teagan (born 1944), an American attorney and politician
 Teagan Clive (born c. 1959), American bodybuilder, actress, and journalist
 Teagan Croft (born 2004), Australian actress
 Teagan O'Keeffe (born 1992), a South African female BMX rider
 Teagan Quitoriano (born 2000), American football player

See also
 Tegan, a given name of Welsh origin
 Teigen (disambiguation)
 Ned Nefer and Teagan, a man/mannequin couple

Irish feminine given names
Irish-language feminine given names